Pine Hill (often simply called The Pine) is an area in Saint Michael, Barbados, part of the Greater Bridgetown metropolitan area. It is the location of the CBC Broadcasting studios and the Pine Hill Dairy.

References

Populated places in Barbados